Liludi Dharati is a 1957 Gujarati novel by Chunilal Madia. Though it was written is two parts, its plot is extended with inheritors in another separate novel Shevalna  Shatdal (1960). The novel was made into a film by Vallabh Choksi in 1968.

Background
Liludi Dharati was first serialized as a weekly installments in Janmabhumi, a Gujarati newspaper, from 15 November 1956 to 14 September 1957. It was written by Madia on insistence of Sopan, an editor of Janmabhumi. In the preface of the book, Madia mentions that he expected to complete the series in four or five months but it took longer than that.

The title is based  on  Santu's nature.  The  incarnation  of  a  woman is  like green  earth which  never  dries.

The writer has incorporated the local dialects of Saurashtra region in the novel ingeniously as he himself belongs to the land where the novel is set. His descriptions seem indigenous and full  of  vitality.  The novel narrates the region specific festival of Bhim Agiyaras and a sport of coconut throwing.

Plot
This novel narrates the life of trapped and confused woman named Santu under strange circumstances and her miserable plight. The story is set in the remote village near the mountain Girnar namely Gundasar. Though the main story line moves around a farmer family of Hada Patel, it also includes smaller accounts of other supportive characters, giving a picture of the village life, especially elaborate negative characters and their negativity. Hada Patel has three sons. The elder one has left the village and turned a monk, the second one dies due to some disease and story commences with the last son Gobar and his fiance Santu. The story progresses depicting the struggle of pregnant Santu bearing the blame of her husband's murder.

The other major characters are Mandal (cousin of Gobar), Shadul (son of a landlord), Ragha Gor, a Brahmin hotel owner.

Reception
Bhagvanbhai  H. Chaudhari in his article "Chunilala Madia's Liludi Dharati: A Narrative centered on Saurastra Region" mentions that though Chunilal Madia wanted to develop the novel a chronicle, however he fails as "characters  portrayed  in  novel Liludi Dharati does not manifest the universal life incorporating the constant changing nature" However since  as society  or  destiny are shown as the central elements which  manage the  entire  human  life,  the  novel  shows  the vague form  of plot called chronicle. Critic Nalin Raval considered it a time-dominated or period novel.

Critic Dilavarsinh  Jadeja  opines that  "the  true  picture  of  bare  reality  of  rural life  and  the emphasis  towards  it  should  be  considered  Madiya's  specialty  among  Gujarati  novelists".

Adaption
Liludi Dharati was adapted into Gujarati film with the same name in 1968 by Vallabh Choksi. It was the first colour film of Gujarati cinema.

Further reading

References

20th-century Indian novels
Gujarati-language novels
Indian novels adapted into films
1957 novels
Novels first published in serial form
Third-person narrative novels